IV Riigikogu was the fourth legislature of the Estonian Parliament (Riigikogu). The legislature was elected after 1929 elections (held on 11–13 May 1929). It sat between 15 June 1929 and 14 June 1932, before the next round of elections were held.

Parties and seats

Officers 
The following is a list of the Riigikogu's officers during the fourth legislative session:

Chairman 
 Kaarel Eenpalu, from 02.07.1929

First Assistant Chairman 
 Mihkel Martna, from 02.07.1929

Second Assistant Chairman 
 Rudolf Penno, from 02.07.1929

Secretary 
 Arnold Paul Schulbach, from 02.07.1929

First Assistant Secretary 
 August Tõllasepp, from 02.07.1929

Second Assistant Secretary 
 Jaan Piiskar, 02.07.1929 – 13.03.1930
 Oskar Gustavson, from 13.03.1930

Members of the Riigikogu

References

Riigikogu